The communauté de communes du Carrefour des Quatre Provinces was located in the Creuse département of the Nouvelle-Aquitaine region of central France. It was created in January 1999. It was merged into the new Communauté de communes Creuse Confluence in January 2017.

It comprised the following 15 communes:

Blaudeix
Cressat
La Celle-sous-Gouzon
Domeyrot
Gouzon
Jarnages
Ladapeyre
Parsac-Rimondeix
Pierrefitte
Pionnat
Saint-Julien-le-Châtel
Saint-Loup
Saint-Silvain-sous-Toulx
Trois-Fonds
Vigeville

References 

Carrefour des Quatre Provinces